was a Japanese sportsman, diplomat and political figure.  He served as the Japanese foreign minister in the 1950s. He was also the final – and only Japanese – chairman of the Shanghai Municipal Council.

Early life

Okazaki was born on 10 July 1897 in Kanagawa, Japan.  He was the 10th son of Yasunosuke Okazaki.  He studied law at the University of Tokyo and then joined the Japanese Ministry of Foreign Affairs.

Sporting prowess

Okazaki participated in the 1924 Paris Olympic Summer Games, qualifying for the 5,000 m final with a time of 15.22.2e. In the final, he fainted in the heatwave and was carried away by medics. He had much success at the Far Eastern Championship Games, winning the mile run at the 1921 Games then doing a middle-distance double in the mile and 880 yards at the 1923 event in Osaka.

Consular positions
Okasaki served as second secretary to the Japanese Embassy in Washington, D.C. in the early 1930s.

He also served in numerous positions in China during the 1930s, including serving as Japanese Consul-General in Nanjing after the Fall of Nanking to the Imperial Japanese Army and during the Nanking Massacre. In 1938, he was serving as Japanese Consul General in Canton. In October 1939 was appointed Japanese Consul at Hong Kong, a position he held until January 1941.

Shanghai Municipal Council

In early January 1942 Okazaki was appointed as Chairman of the Shanghai Municipal Council after the British and American members resigned following the commencement of the Pacific War and the occupation of the Shanghai International Settlement by Japanese troops.  After the resignation of the Commissioner General, G. Godfrey Phillips which took effect from 1 March 1942, Okasaki also took over the role of Commissioner General in an honorary capacity. He served until 1943 when the Council was disbanded.

Surrender of Japan

Okazaki took part in the surrender negotiations between the Japanese emissaries and American military officials on Iejima in 1945.

Post-war political and diplomatic career

Okazaki was elected to the Japanese House of Representatives in 1949.   In 1951, he was appointed by Prime Minister Shigeru Yoshida as Chief Cabinet Secretary and state minister without portfolio.

In 1952, he was appointed Foreign Minister and served in that position until 1954.  In 1954, building on work by Ikeda, Okazaki signed a Mutual Security Assistance (MSA) Agreement with U.S. Ambassador John Allison.

In 1961 he was called out of retirement to serve in the United Nations  in what was described at the time as a move to strengthen the Japanese delegation. He served as Japan's delegate to the United Nations from April 1961 to July 1963.

Death

Okazaki died on 10 October 1965 in Tokyo of a stomach ulcer at the age of 68.

Family members

Okazaki was married to Shimako with whom he had a son, Taro, and a daughter, Yoshiko.

He is the grandfather of the Japanese-American figure skater Kyoko Ina, Yoshiko's daughter.

References 

|-

|-

|-

|-

|-

1897 births
1965 deaths
Sportspeople from Yokohama
Politicians from Yokohama
Japanese sportsperson-politicians
Japanese male middle-distance runners
Japanese male long-distance runners
Olympic male long-distance runners
Olympic athletes of Japan
Athletes (track and field) at the 1924 Summer Olympics
Japan Championships in Athletics winners
Government ministers of Japan
Foreign ministers of Japan
Members of the House of Representatives (Japan)
Permanent Representatives of Japan to the United Nations
Chairmen of the Shanghai Municipal Council
University of Tokyo alumni
Consuls General of Japan in Hong Kong